The Coniston Fell Race is an annual Lake District fell race held in April or May, starting and finishing in the village of Coniston.

History
The race was first run in 1982 and quickly became popular, attracting some of the best fell runners. In 1985, a bottleneck at the start of the route with 560 runners caused an entry limit of 400 to be introduced for future editions.

In 2016, inclement weather in the days leading up to the race resulted in a shorter route being used, avoiding some of the higher ground.

Coniston has been one of the counting races in the British or English Fell Running Championships on several occasions.

Results
The men's record is held by Ian Holmes with a time of 1:03:29, set in 1996. Coniston was an English and British championship race that year and despite Mark Kinch running what he described as "the perfect race", he was overtaken by Holmes on the final descent.

The women's record of 1:17:11 was set in 2014 by Victoria Wilkinson.

Holmes has the most victories, with ten between 1993 and 2018.

The winners have been as follows.

 The race report in The Fellrunner, Jun 2000, suggests that Louise Sharp was the winner in 1:39:01, but the 2001 championships preview in The Fellrunner Magazine, Feb 2001, indicates that the first woman in 2000 had been Nicola Davies in 1:31:28.

 Short course.

References

Fell running competitions in Cumbria